Anita Rose Morris (March 14, 1943 – March 2, 1994) was an American actress, singer and dancer. She began her career performing in Broadway musicals, including Jesus Christ Superstar, Seesaw and Nine, for which she received a Tony Award nomination.

During her career, Morris had starring roles in a number of films, include The Hotel New Hampshire (1984), Absolute Beginners (1986), Ruthless People (1986), Aria (1987), 18 Again! (1988), Bloodhounds of Broadway (1989) and A Sinful Life (1989). She had leading roles in two short-lived television series in 1980s: the NBC prime time soap opera Berrenger's (1985), and the Fox sitcom Down and Out in Beverly Hills (1987).

Career
Morris' most prominent film role was as Carol Dodsworth, the mistress to Danny DeVito, in Ruthless People; her most prominent stage role was her sensual performance as Carla in the musical Nine opposite Raul Julia. While nominated for a Best Featured Actress Tony Award as Carla, she lost to Liliane Montevecchi, also in Nine. 21 years later, Jane Krakowski won the Tony Award in the same category as Morris, playing Carla in a revival with Antonio Banderas. Her signature number in Nine was "A Call from the Vatican", and she also sang "Simple", late in act two. She was scheduled to perform the former at the Tony Awards in 1982, but the television censors found her outfit too revealing. Her stage work began in the American Mime Theatre, and carried her to Broadway both for Nine, Jesus Christ Superstar, Seesaw, The Magic Show (cast album and video/DVD), Sugar Babies (replacement for the "Soubrette" originated by Ann Jillian) and The Best Little Whorehouse in Texas.

Morris portrayed Rob Lowe's lover Rhonda Ray in The Hotel New Hampshire (1984). Other film work included The Happy Hooker (1975), Maria's Lovers (1984), Absolute Beginners (1986) with David Bowie, Blue City (1986) with Judd Nelson, Ruthless People (1986) with Danny DeVito and Bette Midler, 18 Again! (1988) with George Burns, Bloodhounds of Broadway (1989) with Madonna and Matt Dillon, A Sinful Life (1989), Martians Go Home (1989) with Randy Quaid, Off and Running (1991) with Cyndi Lauper, Little Miss Millions (1993) with Jennifer Love Hewitt, Me and the Kid (1993), and Radioland Murders (1994), which was her final film role.

During the 1980s and early 1990s, she played guest roles in sitcoms and dramas, including Miami Vice, Who's the Boss?, Murder, She Wrote, Cheers, Melrose Place, Matlock, Tales from the Crypt, Murphy Brown and A Different World. In 1984, Morris was featured in The Rolling Stones' music video "She Was Hot".

Personal life
Morris was born in Durham, North Carolina, to Eloise (née Chappell), who was involved in theatrical production, and James Badgett Morris, a doctor. 

She was married to Grover Dale in 1973 and had a son, James Badge Dale, in 1978, who developed an acting career beginning in 1990.

Death
She developed ovarian cancer in 1980, and given only five years to live. She actually lived for another 14 years before her death on March 2, 1994, twelve days before her 51st birthday. She was buried in Maplewood Cemetery in her native Durham, North Carolina.

Filmography

References

External links
 
 
 
 
 

1943 births
1994 deaths
20th-century American actresses
20th-century American dancers
20th-century American singers
20th-century American women singers
Actresses from Durham, North Carolina
Actresses from North Carolina
American female dancers
American film actresses
American musical theatre actresses
American television actresses
Burials in North Carolina
Dancers from North Carolina
Deaths from cancer in California
Deaths from ovarian cancer
Musicians from Durham, North Carolina